Live at McCabe's Guitar Shop is a live album by singer-songwriter Freedy Johnston. It was recorded in 1998 and released in 2006 on Shout! Factory Records.

Track listing
All songs written by Freedy Johnston, except where noted.
"Introduction" – 0:52
"The Farthest Lights" – 4:14
"Radio for Heartache" – 3:26
"Underwater Life" – 5:18
"Moving on a Holiday" – 3:14
"Pretend It's Summer" – 5:31
"Evie's Tears" – 3:29
"Gone Like the Water" – 3:16
"You Get Me Lost" – 4:56
"Two Lovers Stop" – 2:54
"Wichita Lineman" (Jimmy Webb) – 4:44
"Western Sky" – 4:32
"This Perfect World" – 5:27
"Bad Reputation" – 4:23

Personnel
Freedy Johnston – vocals, guitar, banjo
Mark Spencer – guitar, backing vocals

References 

2006 albums
Freedy Johnston albums
Shout! Factory albums